Philips Cavalcade is a 1939 animated short film in the Puppetoon series. It was directed by George Pal.

It was also included in the 1987 compilation film The Puppetoon Movie.

Plot
This took place where the people start singing and a woman Philippa Ray sings a song on the microphone. There were people dancing in playing instruments. In the on the stage four men are singing. One sings soprano and one sings bass. Suddenly one person plays the trumpet and other people start singing. They start dancing at the end.

External links
 

1934 films
Dutch animated short films
Short films directed by George Pal
Paramount Pictures short films
Puppetoons
1934 animated films
Stop-motion animated short films
1930s animated short films
American animated short films
1930s American films